HMS Griffin (H31) was a G-class destroyer, built for the Royal Navy in the mid-1930s. In World War II she took part in the Norwegian Campaign of April–May 1940 and the Battle of Dakar in September before being transferred to the Mediterranean Fleet in November. She generally escorted larger ships of the Mediterranean Fleet as they protected convoys against attacks from the Italian Fleet. Griffin took part in the Battle of Cape Matapan in March 1941 and the evacuations of Greece and Crete in April–May 1941. In June she took part in the Syria-Lebanon Campaign and was escorting convoys and the larger ships of the Mediterranean Fleet until she was transferred to the Eastern Fleet in March 1942.

Griffin saw no action in the Japanese Indian Ocean raid in April, but was escorting convoys for most of her time in the Indian Ocean. In June she returned to the Mediterranean to escort another convoy to Malta in Operation Vigorous. Beginning in November 1942, she was converted to an escort destroyer in the United Kingdom and was transferred to the Royal Canadian Navy on 1 March 1943. The ship, now renamed HMCS Ottawa, was assigned to escort convoys in the North Atlantic until she was transferred in May 1944 to protect the forces involved with the Normandy Landings. Working with other destroyers, Ottawa sank three German submarines off the French coast before she returned to Canada for a lengthy refit. After the end of the European war in May 1945 she was used to bring Canadian troops until she was paid off in October 1945. Ottawa was sold for scrap in August 1946.

Description
Steam for the turbines was provided by three Admiralty 3-drum boilers. Her complement was 137 officers and men in peacetime, but in increased to 146 in wartime.

The ship mounted four 45-calibre 4.7-inch (120 mm) Mark IX guns in single mounts. For anti-aircraft (AA) defence, Griffin had two quadruple Mark I mounts for the 0.5 inch Vickers Mark III machine gun. She was fitted with two above-water quadruple torpedo tube mounts for  torpedoes. One depth charge rail and two throwers were fitted; 20 depth charges were originally carried, but this increased to 35 shortly after the war began.

Beginning in mid-1940, her anti-aircraft armament was increased although when exactly the modifications were made is not known. Two more Oerlikon guns were also added in the forward superstructure.

Service history
Griffin was laid down by Vickers-Armstrongs Naval Construction Works at Barrow-in-Furness on 20 September 1934, launched on 15 August 1935, and completed on 6 March 1936. Excluding government-furnished equipment such as armament, she cost £248,518. Griffin joined her sisters and was assigned to the 1st Destroyer Flotilla of the Mediterranean Fleet upon commissioning. She escorted the ocean liner SS Strathnaver between Malta and Alexandria in the Munich Crisis in September 1938. She then escorted the light cruiser  on her voyage to Aden. She collided with the target destroyer  on 2 February 1939 and her repairs were completed five days later.

With the Royal Navy, 1939–1942
On 3 September 1939 Griffin was in Alexandria and still assigned to the 1st Destroyer Flotilla. In October she was transferred to home waters.

She rejoined her flotilla at Harwich in November, where they patrolled the North Sea and escorted local convoys. She rescued survivors from her sister  after that ship struck a mine off Harwich on 21 November. She was damaged the same month and was under repair until 6 December. In preparation for the Norwegian Campaign, Griffin was transferred to the Home Fleet at Scapa Flow in April 1940.Griffin escorted the capital ships of the Home Fleet as they sortied into the North Sea on 7 April and continued that duty for the next several weeks. 

On 26 April, Griffin and the destroyer  captured the German trawler Schiff 26, bound for Narvik with a cargo that included guns, mines and ammunition. She was disguised as the Dutch Polares and armed with one gun and two torpedo tubes. Crewmen aboard the trawler failed to properly dispose of some of her code documents when she was boarded from Griffin. The recovered material allowed Bletchley Park to retrospectively break 6 days of naval Enigma codes. Whilst not operationally useful, this was the first break of the code and gave Alan Turing essential information on how Enigma was used, so allowing methods to be developed for future breaks. This was the first of several similar captures that were essential for the continued Allied breaking of the naval Enigma codes.

Griffin evacuated British and French troops from Namsos, and rescued survivors from the destroyer  after she was sunk by Junkers Ju 87 Stuka dive bombers on 3 May. The Stukas also attacked Griffin, without success. Griffin was then transferred to the 13th Destroyer Flotilla of the North Atlantic Command at Gibraltar. She escorted the capital ships of Force H in the Battle of Dakar on 23 September, but was not engaged. Griffin herself was transferred to the 14th Destroyer Flotilla in Alexandria and took part in the inconclusive Battle of Cape Spartivento on 27 November in Operation Collar.

In Operation Excess, Gallant struck a mine off Pantellaria on 10 January 1941 and Griffin rescued most of the survivors. In February 1941 she was transferred to the Red Sea where she escorted the aircraft carrier  in the latter's operations in support of the military offensive in Italian Somaliland ("Operation Canvas"). Griffin escorted the capital ships of the Mediterranean Fleet in the Battle of Cape Matapan on 28–29 March. With her sister , she attacked some of the Italian destroyers, but lost them when they passed through their own smokescreen. Griffin, the Australian destroyer , and the gunboat  bombarded Axis positions near Sollum in northwestern Egypt on 15 April.

She took part in the evacuation of British, Australian and New Zealand troops from Greece at the end of April. On 25 April a German air attack crippled the Dutch troop ship , which Griffin had been escorting to Megara to evacuate Allied troops. Griffin rescued about 300 survivors, sank Pennland by gunfire, and took the survivors to Crete.

Griffin again escorted the capital ships of the Mediterranean Fleet as they covered a convoy from Alexandria to Malta on 8 May. In the evacuation of Crete at the end of May, Griffin evacuated 720 men from Souda Bay.

During Operation Exporter, the ship escorted the Australian light cruiser  as she bombarded Vichy French positions in Lebanon on 2 July. Griffin escorted convoys to and from Tobruk from July to November. She escorted the light cruiser  when that ship bombarded Derna in early December and was transferred to the 2nd Destroyer Flotilla later that month. Griffin escorted convoys to Malta in January and February 1942. until she was transferred to the Eastern Fleet in the Indian Ocean in late February. Griffin was assigned to Force A of the fleet in the Indian Ocean raid by the Japanese in early April 1942. She returned to the Mediterranean to take part in Operation Vigorous, another convoy from Alexandria to Malta, in June. She rejoined the Eastern Fleet afterwards and escorted convoys there until ordered home to begin conversion to an escort destroyer in September.

Refit and transfer to Canada, 1942–1946
Work on the conversion began on 2 November in Southampton and included the removal of two 4.7-inch guns and the 12-pounder AA gun, and their replacement with a Hedgehog anti-submarine mortar forward and additional depth charges aft. Type 286 and 271 radar sets were fitted, as well as additional 20 mm Oerlikon AA guns. While still refitting, on 1 March 1943, Griffin was transferred to the Royal Canadian Navy, and commissioned on 20 March, four days before her conversion was finished. The ship was renamed Ottawa on 10 April to commemorate an earlier  which had been sunk. After working up at Tobermory, she sailed for Canada, and was gifted to the Canadians on 15 June. Ottawa became the senior ship of Escort Group C5 which worked between St. John's, Newfoundland, and Derry, Northern Ireland until May 1944 when she became the senior ship of the 11th Escort Group.

Ottawa was refitted in St. John's between 12 October 1944 and 26 February 1945. After the end of the war in May she ferried Canadian troops back to Canada until she was paid off on 31 October. Ottawa was sold to the International Iron and Metal Company in August 1946 and subsequently broken up.

Citations

References

Further reading
 
 

 

G and H-class destroyers of the Royal Navy
Ships of the Royal Canadian Navy
Ships built in Barrow-in-Furness
1935 ships
World War II destroyers of the United Kingdom
Canadian River-class destroyers
Canadian River-class destroyers converted from G and H-class destroyers